Forficula decipiens is a species of earwig.

Description
Head is yellowish orange, pronotum, tegmina and legs are yellowish, while the abdomen is reddish brown.

Distribution
This species is present in South Europe (Portugal, Spain, France, Greece, Montenegro and Romania) and in North Africa.

References

Forficulidae
Insects of Europe
Taxa named by Giuseppe Gené
Insects described in 1832